Live in Hollywood: Highlights from the Aquarius Theater Performances is a compilation live album released by the band the Doors, live in Hollywood. The album was released in 2001 by the label of Bright Midnight Archives. Is the first of five albums released by the Doors of the live recordings in the Aquarius Theatre.

This is part of previously unreleased material of the Bright Midnight Archives collection of live albums by the Doors.

Track listings
All songs written by the Doors except where noted.

 Introductions - 1:17
 I Will Never Be Untrue (Jim Morrison) - 3:42
 Build Me a Woman (Morrison) - 5:24
 Who Do You Love? (Bo Diddley) - 7:43
 Little Red Rooster (Willie Dixon) - 6:29
 Gloria (Van Morrison) - 10:04
 Touch Me (Robby Krieger) - 3:29
 The Crystal Ship (Morrison) - 4:03
 Close to You (Dixon) - 7:03
 Rock Me Baby (B.B. King) - 7:21

Personnel
Jim Morrison - Lead vocals
Ray Manzarek - organ, keyboard bass, lead vocals on Close to You
Robby Krieger - electric guitar
John Densmore - drums

References

External links
[ The album in Allmusic].

2001 live albums
Albums produced by Bruce Botnick
Albums recorded at the Aquarius Theater
Bright Midnight Archives
Elektra Records live albums